Youngia nilgiriensis is an endangered perennial herb. It is listed as an endangered species in the Red Data Book on Indian Plants.

Radical leaves are  × , oblanceolate, Iyrate-pinnatifid, acute, upper surface puberulous, lower surface glabrous; petiole long; cauline leaves: lower ones similar to radical leaves or acuminate; upper ones sessile, lanceolate, acuminate-caudate.
Flowers are yellow. Heads are 2–4 together, about 13-flowered. 
Anthers are 2 mm long; appendages 0.25 mm long, acuminate; filament 1 mm long. 
Achenes is 5 mm long, sub-compressed, apex pale and strongly attenuate, base scarcely attenuate, ribs 12–14, unequal, brown. 
Pappus is 5 mm long, 2–3 serrate, ash-grey.

References

Database of Western Ghats Flora, Sahyadri: Western Ghats Ecology and Biodiversity Environmental Information System @ CES, IISc, retrieved 6/8/2007 Species: Youngia nilgiriensis Babcock

nilgiriensis
Endemic flora of India (region)
Flora of Tamil Nadu
Endangered flora of Asia
Plants described in 1940